The term magnetic usually refers to magnetism.

Magnetic may also refer to:

Entertainment
Magnetic (film), a 2015 science-fiction film
"Magnetic" (Smallville), a television episode
Magnetic (video game), a 2003 adventure game
Magnetic (Goo Goo Dolls album), 2013
Magnetic (Kaela Kimura album) or the title song, 2022
Magnetic (Terence Blanchard album) or the title song, 2013
"Magnetic" (Earth, Wind & Fire song), 1983
"Magnetic", a 2017 song by Chlöe Howl

Other
Magnetic Island, off the coast of Townsville, Queensland, Australia
, a former Royal Australian Navy base at Townsville, Queensland, Australia
SS Magnetic, a passenger tender of the White Star Line

See also